XHNS-FM is a radio station on 96.9 FM in Acapulco, Guerrero, Mexico.

History
XHNS received its concession on September 13, 1973. It was owned by Eduardo Morales Díaz de la Vega and originally had an ERP of 3.57 kW. Díaz de la Vega sold XHNS to Estéreo Ritmo, S.A., in August 1985, and by the 1990s, the station had an ERP of 9 kW.

Starting January 3, 2022, the four Radiorama stations in Acapulco (XHKOK, XHCI, XHNS, and XHPA) were leased to a new operator, Grupo Radio Visión. XHNS took on the W Radio format from Radiópolis.

References

Radio stations in Guerrero
1973 establishments in Mexico
Radio stations established in 1973